Kvitravn is the fifth studio album by the Norwegian Nordic folk band Wardruna, released on 22 January 2021.

Lead singer Einar Selvik stated that the album "marks a distinct evolution in our sound", "features a broad selection of both traditional and historical instruments", and "discusses Northern sorcery, spirit-animals, shadows, nature and animism, the wisdom and meanings of certain myths, various Norse spiritual concepts, and the relation between sage and songs".

Reception
Robert Hoftun Gjestad of Aftenposten wrote that Kvitravn has a fascinating soundscape but the songs sometimes become too monotonous. Financial Times wrote that the instruments and natural sounds "create a sense of huge elemental drama with heroic human actors" and described the songs as "stirring, solemn affairs, driven forward by hammered drums and chanted choral vocals". Nöjesguidens Christoffer Bertzell said he was fascinated by Wardruna's exploration of musical roots, writing that Kvitravn is more "driven, dynamic and ritualistic" than the band's previous Runaljod trilogy, and has a greater "vocal focus" thanks to the guest vocalist Kirsten Bråten Berg.

Track listing
 "Synkverv" – 4:50
 "Kvitravn" – 6:17
 "Skugge" – 6:38
 "Grá" – 3:33
 "Fylgjutal" – 7:05
 "Munin" – 5:26
 "Kvit hjort" – 5:41
 "Viseveiding" – 4:48
 "Ni" – 4:28
 "Vindavlarljod" – 6:39
 "Andvevarljod" – 10:16

Personnel
 Kvitrafn – vocals, drums, percussion, electronics, instruments
 Lindy Fay Hella – vocals

Charts

References

2021 albums
Wardruna albums